Crystal Silence is an album by vibraphonist Gary Burton and pianist Chick Corea. It was recorded in November 1972 and produced by Manfred Eicher for ECM Records. Their collaboration continued in 1979 with the albums Duet and In Concert, Zürich, October 28, 1979, also on ECM Records. Nearly 30 years later they followed up this album with The New Crystal Silence in 2008, this time on Concord Records.

Track listing 
"Señor Mouse" (Chick Corea) - 6:20
"Arise, Her Eyes" (Steve Swallow) - 5:08
"I'm Your Pal" (Steve Swallow) - 4:02
"Desert Air" (Chick Corea) - 6:26
"Crystal Silence" (Chick Corea) - 9:05
"Falling Grace" (Steve Swallow) - 2:42
"Feelings And Things" (Mike Gibbs) - 4:46
"Children's Song" (Chick Corea) - 2:11
"What Game Shall We Play Today" (Chick Corea) - 3:46

Personnel 
 Chick Corea – piano
 Gary Burton – vibraphone

Chart performance

References 

1973 albums
Chick Corea albums
Gary Burton albums
Albums produced by Manfred Eicher